Five species of indigobird are known as paradise whydah:

 Togo paradise whydah, Vidua togoensis
 Long-tailed paradise whydah, Vidua interjecta
 Eastern paradise whydah, Vidua paradisaea
 Northern paradise whydah, Vidua orientalis
 Broad-tailed paradise whydah, Vidua obtusa